Gum trees, Eucalyptus species, are used as food plants by the caterpillars of a number of Lepidoptera (butterflies and moths). These include:

Monophagous
Species which feed exclusively on Eucalyptus

 Bucculatricidae
 Bucculatrix eucalypti
 Hepialidae
 Abantiades latipennis (pindi moth) – root feeder, only on messmate stringybark (E. obliqua) and stringy gum (E. regnans)
 Aenetus montanus – trunk burrower
 Aenetus ombraloma – trunk burrower

Polyphagous
Species which feed on Eucalyptus among other plants

 Arctiidae
 Eupseudosoma aberrans
 Eupseudosoma involutum (snowy eupseudosoma)
 Hepialidae
 Other Abantiades spp. – root feeders
 Aenetus eximia – trunk burrower
 Aenetus ligniveren – trunk burrower
 Aenetus ramsayi – trunk burrower
 Aenetus scotti – trunk burrower
 Aenetus virescens (puriri moth) – trunk burrower
 Endoclita auratus
 Endoclita hosei
 Endoclita malabaricus
 Endoclita undulifer
 Trichophassus giganteus
 Zelotypia stacyi (bentwing ghost moth) – trunk burrower
 Noctuidae
 Agrotis segetum (turnip moth)
 Oecophoridae
 All known species of Crossophora
 Tortricidae
 "Cnephasia" jactatana (black-lyre leafroller moth)

References

External links

eucalyptus
+Lepidoptera